Lois Sasson (April 28, 1940 – December 30, 2020) was an American jewelry designer, gay rights activist, and longtime partner of late singer-songwriter Lesley Gore.

Early life and education 
Lois Sasson was born Lois Diane Kahaner on April 28, 1940, in Brooklyn, New York. Sol, her father, imported fine lace, and Helen (Seiden) Kahaner was a homemaker. Lois grew up in Jamaica Estates in Queens, New York. She went to Mount Ida Junior College in Newton, Massachusetts, and then New York University.

Career 
Her career in jewelry design began to grow in the 1970s. Her work was featured in New York magazine.  Sasson created high-end jewelry, sometimes designed in partnership with Geoffrey Thomas, sold in stores such as Bergdorf Goodman. She also had some of her work on display in art galleries. By 2015, Sasson became well known for her work with precious stones, encrusted cufflinks, and tuxedo button covers. On Valentine's Day that year a set of men's jewelry called "The Ambassador Set" went on sale for $16,000.

Philanthropy
Sasson designed and donated "Compassion" cufflinks in support of the Center for the Advancement of Women. She also donated 35% of jewelry sales received at a benefit for a woman with aplastic anemia in 2013.

Personal life and death 
Her early marriage to Raymond Sasson ended in divorce. Lois lived with her partner, singer Lesley Gore ("It's My Party"), whom she started dating in the mid-1980s, for 33 years, until Gore's death in 2015.

Sasson died from COVID-19 at Weill Cornell Medical Center in New York City on December 30, 2020, aged 80. Her only survivor was her sister Susan Kahaner.

References 

1940 births
2020 deaths
Deaths from the COVID-19 pandemic in New York (state)
American jewelry designers
American LGBT rights activists
People from Brooklyn
Women jewellers
American lesbian artists